Teletraining is training that 
 usually conveys live instruction via telecommunications facilities, 
 may be accomplished on a point-to-point basis or on a point-to-multipoint basis, and 
 may assume forms including teleseminars, a teleconference, or an electronic classroom, usually including both audio and video.

Synonyms
 distance education
 distance learning
 distance training
 electronic classroom
 virtual instruction

See also 
 Audiovisual education

References 

Educational technology
Telecommunication services
Training
Teleconferencing
Videotelephony